Matt Larson was the founder and CEO of Confio Software. Larson is well known as a co-founder of the non-profit Guardian of Angels Foundation based in Denver, Colorado. He is an international speaker and the co-author of several books on technology. In 2013, Ernst and Young named Larson a finalist for “Entrepreneur of the Year.”

Education
Matt Larson earned a Bachelor of Science from the University of Colorado in Business Administration. He graduated first in his class and is a member of the Mensa Society.

Professional career
Larson began his career as an intern at Oracle, the computer technology company, after his graduation from the University of Colorado. In 2002, after a brief time working in the oil and gas industry, Larson founded Confio Software. Confio was a Boulder, Colorado-based software company that “develops database performance solution for DBAs, IT managers, and database developers, for both physical and virtual server environments.”. In 2013 Confio Software was acquired by SolarWinds Inc.

In 2008, Larson also launched, and briefly ran, a small private equity company.

Philanthropy
Larson is the co-founder of Guardian of Angels with his wife, Melanie Larson. The private, non-profit foundation is based in Denver, Colorado and focuses on reducing the “incidence of child sexual abuse.” Larson and his wife are also partners in Social Venture Partners, a community of investors who donate funds to non-profit organizations.

Awards and recognition
In 2013, Ernst & Young named Matt Larson a finalist for its “Entrepreneur of the Year” award.

References

American computer programmers
University of Colorado alumni
Living people
American technology chief executives
Mensans
Year of birth missing (living people)